Trimeniaceae is a family of flowering plants recognized by most taxonomists, at least for the past several decades.
It is a small family of one genus, Trimenia, with eight known species (Christenhusz & Byng 2016) of woody plants, bearing essential oils. The family is subtropical to tropical and found in Southeast Asia, eastern Australia and on several Pacific Islands.

Taxonomy

APG IV
The APG IV system, of 2016, recognizes this family and places it in order Austrobaileyales, an order which is accepted as being among the most basal lineages in the clade angiosperms.

APG III
The APG III system, of 2009, also recognizes such a family and places it in order Austrobaileyales, an order which is accepted as being among the most basal lineages in the clade angiosperms.

APG II
The APG II system, of 2003, also recognizes such a family and places it in order Austrobaileyales, an order which is accepted as being among the most basal lineages in the clade angiosperms.

APG
The APG system, of 1998, also recognized this family, but left it unplaced as to order, and regarded it as being among the most basal lineages in the clade angiosperms.

Cronquist
The Cronquist system, of 1981, accepted this family and placed it in
 the order Laurales,
 in subclass Magnoliidae,
 in class Magnoliopsida [=dicotyledons], 
 of division Magnoliophyta [=angiosperms].

Thorne
The Thorne system (1992) accepted this family and placed it in
 the order Magnoliales,  
 in superorder Magnolianae,
 in subclass Magnoliideae [=dicotyledons], 
 in class Magnoliopsida [=angiosperms].

Dahlgren
The Dahlgren system accepted this family and placed it in
 the order Laurales,
 in superorder Magnolianae,
 in subclass Magnoliideae [=dicotyledons], 
 in class Magnoliopsida [=angiosperms].

Engler
The Engler system, in the update of 1964, accepted this family and placed it in
 the order Magnoliales, which was placed 
 in subclass Archychlamydeae,
 in class Dicotyledoneae, 
 in subdivision Angiospermae

References

 Trimeniaceae in L. Watson and M.J. Dallwitz (1992 onwards) The families of flowering plants: descriptions, illustrations, identification, information retrieval. Version: 3 May 2006. http://delta-intkey.com.

External links
 e-flora
 NCBI Taxonomy Browser

Austrobaileyales
Angiosperm families
Monogeneric plant families